James William Hennigan Sr. (November 24, 1890 – September 30, 1969) was an American businessman and politician.

Hennigan was born in Boston, Massachusetts. Hennigan was involved in the insurance and real estate businesses. Hennigan served in the Massachusetts House of Representatives from 1931 to 1936 and in the Massachusetts Senate in 1937 and 1938. He was a Democrat. Hennigan also served the Massachusetts tax collector until 1960. He died at his home in Jamaica Plain, in Boston, Massachusetts. Hennigan's son was James W. Hennigan Jr. and his granddaughter was Maura Hennigan; they were also involved in politics.

See also
 Massachusetts legislature: 1931–1932, 1933–1934, 1935–1936, 1937–1938

Notes

External links

1890 births
1969 deaths
Businesspeople from Boston
Politicians from Boston
Democratic Party members of the Massachusetts House of Representatives
Democratic Party Massachusetts state senators
20th-century American politicians
20th-century American businesspeople